Qualifier 2 of the Qualifying Round of the 2013 World Baseball Classic was held at Armin-Wolf-Arena, Regensburg, Germany from September 20 to 24, 2012.

Qualifier 2 was a modified double-elimination tournament. The winners for the first games matched up in the second game, while the losers faced each other in an elimination game. The winners of the elimination game then played the losers of the non-elimination game in another elimination game. The remaining two teams then played each other to determine the winners of the Qualifier 2.

Bracket

Results
All times are Central European Summer Time (UTC+02:00).

Canada 11, Great Britain 1

Germany 16, Czech Republic 1

Great Britain 12, Czech Republic 5

Canada 16, Germany 7

Germany 16, Great Britain 1

Canada 11, Germany 1

External links
Official website

Qualifier 2
World Baseball Classic – Qualifier 2
World Baseball Classic – Qualifier 2
International baseball competitions hosted by Germany
World Baseball Classic – Qualifier 2
Sports competitions in Bavaria
Sport in Regensburg